Father Anton Ranjith Pillainayagam, also known as Anton Ranjith, was born on September 23, 1966, in Jaffna. As of July 13, 2020, he is serving as the Auxiliary Bishop of the Archdiocese of Colombo. He has also been serving as the director of Tamil Theologate since 2009 and as the Rector of St. Sebastian's College, Moratuwa since 2019.

Career 
He pursued his primary and secondary education at St. Benedict's College, Colombo in 1973 in Colombo and at St. Patrick's College from 1974 onwards. He studied philosophy at the St. Francis Xavier Major Seminary in Jaffna and studied theology at the National Seminary of Kandy. He obtained his bachelor's degree in mathematics from the University of Jaffna. He also received his master's degree in education from the University of Middlesex and Master's degree in philosophy from the University of Jaffna. 

He was ordained as a priest on September 16, 2000, in the Cathedral of St. Lucia, Colombo. On July 13, 2020, he was appointed as the new Auxiliary Bishop in the Roman Catholic Archdiocese of Colombo by Pope Francis.

References 

21st-century Roman Catholic bishops in Sri Lanka
Auxiliary bishops
People from Jaffna
1966 births
Living people
Roman Catholic auxiliary bishops of Colombo